US Post Office-Seneca Falls is a historic post office building located at Seneca Falls in Seneca County, New York.  It was designed and built in 1932-1934 and is one of a number of post offices in New York State designed by the Office of the Supervising Architect of the Treasury Department, James A. Wetmore. It is irregular in plan, with a "U" shaped, two story main block with a one-story interior section, and a one-story rear wing with a mailing platform.  The facades are clad in buff-colored brick and limestone and executed in the Classical Revival style with Art Deco decorative detailing.

It was listed on the National Register of Historic Places in its own right in 1989, and is also a contributing property to the NRHP-listed Seneca Falls Village Historic District established in 1991.

References

Seneca Falls
Neoclassical architecture in New York (state)
Government buildings completed in 1934
Art Deco architecture in New York (state)
Buildings and structures in Seneca County, New York
National Register of Historic Places in Seneca County, New York
Seneca Falls, New York
1934 establishments in New York (state)